is a sushi delicacy of Japan, and a form of sashimi. The sushi contains baby shrimp that are still alive and able to move their legs and antennae while being eaten. The meal is prepared quickly to keep the shrimp alive, and when it is eaten the shrimp are usually dunked into sake so as to intoxicate the shrimp, then into a special dipping sauce, and finally quickly chewed to kill it.

The shrimp can be served either whole or shelled with the head removed; the head and shell are sometimes quickly deep fried and served on the side.

Consuming uncooked shellfish may be a serious health hazard due to the risk of paragonimiasis.

See also 

 Ikizukuri, the preparation of sashimi from living animals
 Sannakji, raw octopus eaten in Korean cuisine
 Drunken shrimp, shrimp sometimes eaten alive in Chinese cuisine

References 

Animal welfare
Dishes involving the consumption of live animals
Sushi